Phạm Tuân ( born 14 February 1947) is a retired Vietnam Air Force aviator and cosmonaut. He became the first Vietnamese citizen and the first person from an Asian country to fly in space when he launched aboard the Soyuz 37 mission as an Interkosmos Research Cosmonaut. He was awarded the title Hero of the Soviet Union.

Early life and military career
Phạm Tuân was born in Kiến Xương, Thái Bình province in northern Vietnam. Joining the Vietnam People's Air Force (VPAF) in 1965 initially as a radar mechanic student in 1965, Tuân was then selected for pilot training as a commissioned officer, graduating at the Krasnodar Flight School in the Soviet Union as a MiG-17 pilot in 1967, then moved-up for training in the MiG-21, and becoming assigned to the VPAF 910th Air Training Regiment from 1968–69 while participating in developing night-time interception techniques against U.S. air raids, and then attached with the 923rd Fighter Regiment from 1969–70, finally with the 921st Fighter Regiment from 1970–73.

On the nights of 18-27 December 1972, during Operation Linebacker II (also referred to as the Christmas Bombings), then-Major Phạm engaged USAF Strategic Air Command (SAC) B-52 Stratofortress heavy bombers at least a dozen times. On the 27th, Phạm was able to get close to a B-52 formation at supersonic-speed in his MiG-21MF (#5121), and fire a pair of missiles in the sub-4km range, visually identifying and reporting that his missile(s) struck the B-52D, causing it to go down in flames over the border of Hoa Binh–Vinh Phuc provinces. This claim, which would be the only B-52 ever downed in air-to-air combat, is disputed by U.S. records,  which claims that this B-52 was downed by a surface-to-air missile as with all other B-52s shot down during the war. In a book named "Hà Nội - Điện Biên Phủ trên không" (Hanoi - the Battle of Dien Bien Phu in the air) by Nguyễn Minh Tâm, published by Nhà xuất bản Quân đội Nhân dân Việt Nam (Viet Nam People's Army Publishing House), the author affirms that Phạm Tuân shot down the B-52 with two K-13 air-to-air missiles within a range of 4 kilometers.

Tuân said that because the B-52 was equipped with a large number of infrared decoys, he had to get close to the target (within 2-3 kilometers) in order to ensure the bomber's destruction, though the minimum safe range for launching missiles is at least 8 kilometers. Numerous air-to-air combat victory claims by the MiG pilots of the VPAF against U.S. combat aircraft have been counter-claimed as losses to surface-to-air missiles or anti-aircraft artillery, as it's considered "less embarrassing" than losing to an enemy pilot.

In 1973, Tuân was granted the title of "Hero of the People's Armed Forces" in Vietnam. In 1980, Tuân was awarded the "Vietnam Labor Hero" distinction. In 1989, Tuân was given the position of "Deputy Commander" within the Vietnam People's Air Force. He was promoted to the rank of Lieutenant General in 1999. During the year 2000, Tuan was the position of "Director of the General Department of Defense Industry". He eventually retired from government positions at the end of 2007.

Tuân received numerous distinctions for his service, including the Ho Chi Minh Order. He also was awarded the Order of Lenin and the rare honor of being one of the few foreigners to receive the title "Hero of the Soviet Union".

Interkosmos program
Tuân reached the rank of lieutenant colonel in the VPAF before eventually training to be a research cosmonaut in the joint USSR-Vietnamese space program. Tuân was initially sent to the USSR to train as a radar engineer. There was a shortage of eligible Vietnamese pilots. This was due to most of the applicants not passing the fitness tests. Tuân was pressured into flight training. Due to this, Tuân was one of three Vietnamese pilots and engineers to be selected by the Soviet Union. On 1 April 1979, he was selected as a member of the sixth international crew for the Interkosmos program. His backup was Bùi Thanh Liêm. Tuân, along with Soviet cosmonaut Viktor Gorbatko, was launched from Baikonur Cosmodrome on 23 July 1980, on board the Soyuz 37 mission to the Salyut 6 space station. Tuân was informed only three days prior that he would be the main pilot of the Soyuz 37.

Before the flight a joint Bulgarian – Soviet mission had been cancelled. Tuân was worried that his voyage would share the same fate. During his flight aboard the Soyuz 37, there were technical issues regarding the Soyuz 3’s engine system. Tuân was commanded to shut down all systems and inform Command of the situation. After this, Command restored the engine to normal and the mission continued. 

During his time in orbit, Tuân performed experiments on the melting of mineral samples in microgravity. He also carried out plant experiments on azolla and photographed Vietnam from orbit for mapping purposes. Tuân was in space for 7 days, 20 hours, and 42 minutes, completing 142 orbits, and returned to Earth on 31 July 1980.

Personal life

Tuân brought several things with him on the Soyuz 37 flight. These included pictures of former President Hồ Chí Minh, General Secretary Lê Duân, Hồ Chí Minh’s will, Vietnamese flags. He wanted to stamp all of these at the space station and bring it back to Earth. 

Tuân has stated that his personal relationship with his Russian friends has continued to this day. Every year, he travels long distances to meet up with his fellow Russian cosmonauts.

Tuân is married and has two children. He is now a retired Lieutenant General, director of the General Department of Defense Industry of the Ministry of Defense, and is a non-elected member of the Vietnam National Assembly.

See also
 Weapons of the Vietnam War

References
 Toperczer, Istvan.  MiG-21 Units of the Vietnam War. 2001, Osprey Publishing Limited.  .

Bibliography

External links
Spacefacts biography of Phạm, Tuân
 Vietnam Government Website: Lieutenant General Pham Tuan

1947 births
Living people
North Vietnamese military personnel of the Vietnam War
Foreign Heroes of the Soviet Union
Recipients of the Order of Lenin
Vietnamese astronauts
1980 in spaceflight
Recipients of the Medal "For Merit in Space Exploration"
Recipients of the Order of Ho Chi Minh
Astronaut-politicians
Salyut program cosmonauts